Rosenthal is a surname.

Rosenthal may also refer to:

Places

Australia 
 Rosenthal, South Australia
 Rosenthal Heights, Queensland, a locality in the Southern Downs Region
 Shire of Rosenthal, a former local government area in Queensland, Australia

Canada
 Rosenthal, Edmonton, a neighborhood

Czech Republic 
 Rosenthal, the former German name for Rožmitál pod Třemšínem in the Czech Republic

Germany 
 Rosenthal (Berlin), a part of Berlin, Germany
 Rosenthal, Hesse, in the Waldeck-Frankenberg district
 Rosenthal am Rennsteig, a municipality in the district Saale-Orla-Kreis, in Thuringia, Germany
 Rosenthal, a part of Rosenthal-Bielatal in the Sächsische Schweiz district, Saxony
 Rosenthal, a part of Ralbitz-Rosenthal in Bautzen district, Saxony

Poland 
 Rosenthal, the former German name for Bartoszyce, Poland

Slovenia 
 Rosenthal, the former German name for Rožna Dolina in Slovenia

Other uses
 100268 Rosenthal, an asteroid
 Rosenthal (company), a German porcelain manufacturer

See also
 
 Rosendahl (disambiguation)